Ginyo Gochev Ganev (2 March 1928 – 18 December 2016) was a prominent Bulgarian politician, MP and national ombudsman. He is known as "Man-Parliament" as a deputy in 8 consecutive National Assemblies (3 before 10 November 1989 and 5 thereafter). On 13 April 2005 he was selected from the 39 National Assembly for the first National Ombudsman of the Republic of Bulgaria.

He graduated from the Law Faculty of Sofia University. Then he married the daughter of Kimon Georgiev, the first Prime Minister of Bulgaria after the 1944 coup d'état.

After graduation, he became legal adviser to the initially led by his father-in law Department of Energy from 1953 to 1977. In 1977 he was elected secretary of the National Council of the Fatherland Front, where he remained until 1989.

Ganev is a member of the State Council of the People's Republic of Bulgaria from 1986 to 1990. He refused twice to become Prime minister of Bulgaria – so his place took  Dimitar Popov and Lyuben Berov.

He was awarded the Georgi Dimitrov Order.  On the occasion of his 75th birthday he was awarded with the Stara Planina Order by President Georgi Parvanov.

Ganev was married to Mariya Georgieva from 1953 until hеr death in 1986, the daughter of Kimon Georgiev. They had two sons – Kimon (psychiatrist) and Ivaylo (engineer), two grandsons and two granddaughters.

Awards 
 1978 –  Order of the People's Republic of Bulgaria II class "for the 50th anniversary of his birth and to actively participate in the construction of socialism."

 2003 – Order of Stara Planina I class for his 75th birthday.

 2008 – Order of Saints Cyril and Methodius for his 80th birthday

Works 

 Избрани произведения. София: Партиздат, 1982
 Style: Сентенции. София: Еркюл, 1991, 72 с.
 Викове и шепот. София: Сиела, 1997
 Парламентарен говор и безмълвие. Пловдив: Пигмалион, 2000, 246 с.
 Измислени цитати. София: Сиела, 2003
 Три държавни преврата или Кимон Георгиев и неговото време. София: Сиела, 2007
 Омбудсманиада. София: Сиела, 2010

References

1928 births
2016 deaths
Bulgarian Socialist Party politicians
Members of the National Assembly (Bulgaria)
20th-century Bulgarian lawyers
Politicians from Burgas
Bulgarian Communist Party politicians
Ombudsmen in Bulgaria